"In France They Kiss on Main Street" is a song by Canadian singer-songwriter Joni Mitchell from the album The Hissing of Summer Lawns. It was released as a single in 1976 and reached number 66 on the Billboard Hot 100. The song tells a story of coming of age in the 1950s. It features David Crosby, Graham Nash, and James Taylor on backing vocals, and Jeff "Skunk" Baxter on guitar. Cash Box said that "Joni Mitchell has distilled the essence of romance and spread it liberally through the grooves of this single." Record World called it "an exquisitely textured tune" that has "all the grace and vocal finesse that contributed to the widespread success of 'Free Man.'" The song is played in DAEGAD tuning with a capo on the second fret. An animated music video for the song was created, played on The Old Grey Whistle Test.

Personnel
Personnel taken from Joni Mitchell's website.

Joni Mitchell – vocals, acoustic guitar
Victor Feldman – electric piano
Max Bennett – bass guitar 
John Guerin – drums 
Robben Ford – electric guitar
Jeff “Skunk” Baxter – electric guitar
James Taylor – backing vocals
David Crosby – backing vocals
Graham Nash – backing vocals

Charts

References

Songs about France
Songs about kissing
1975 songs
1976 singles
Joni Mitchell songs